Justo Luis González (born August 9, 1937) is a Cuban-American historical theologian and Methodist elder. He is a prolific author and an influential contributor to the development of Latin American theology. His wife, Catherine Gunsalus González, is a professor emerita at Columbia Theological Seminary, and the two have co-authored several books.

Early life and education
González was born in Havana, Cuba, on August 9, 1937. He received Bachelor of Arts and Bachelor of Science degrees from the Instituto de Marianao in 1954. He then studied at Yale University, receiving a Master of Sacred Theology degree in 1958, a Master of Arts degree in 1960, and a Doctor of Philosophy degree in 1961. He was the youngest person to be awarded the historical theology doctorate at Yale.

Teaching
González taught at the Evangelical Seminary of Puerto Rico for eight years, followed by another eight years at Candler School of Theology of Emory University in Georgia. Now retired, he also served as adjunct professor of history at Columbia Theological Seminary in Decatur, Georgia, and at the Interdenominational Theological Center in Atlanta, Georgia. He is also a retired member of the Rio Grande Conference of the United Methodist Church.

He is a leading voice in the growing field of Hispanic theology, comparable to such figures as Virgilio Elizondo, Orlando Costas, and Ada Maria Isasi-Diaz. González is one of the few first generation Latino theologians to come from a Protestant background  With the Mexican-American United Methodist minister Roy Barton, González helped found the first academic journal related to Latino theology, Apuntes, published by the Mexican-American program of Perkins School of Theology at Southern Methodist University. He also helped to found the Association for Hispanic Theological Education, for which he has twice served as Executive Council Chair.  He was the first Director of the Hispanic Summer Program and helped found the Hispanic Theological Initiative.

A festschrift has been published for him: Hispanic Christian Thought at the Dawn of the 21st Century: Apuntes in Honor of Justo L. González, edited by Alvin Padilla, Roberto Goizueta, Eldin Villafañe (Nashville: Abingdon Press, 2005) with contributions from Roman Catholic and Protestant Latino theologians, historians, and biblical scholars.

Justo González is the main narrator for the video lessons of the Christian Believer study course from Cokesbury publishing.

Gonzalez is also the recipient of the Ecumenism Award from Washington Theological Consortium. This was awarded to him because of his ecumenical work that aims to unify churches with a variety of denominational backgrounds.

Writings
In 1984–5 González wrote a popular two volume textbook entitled The Story of Christianity that covers the history of the church from founding till the present in a readable style. Many students and scholars have read and enjoyed The Story of Christianity as reflect in this review; "A well-informed book on Christianity, the Reformation to present day. A good resource for theologians or even if you just have an interest."

He is also the author of a three volume work titled History of Christian Thought. Both works commonly are used as college and seminary textbooks.

Additional books include:
 .
 .
 .
 .
 .
 .
 .
 .
 .
 .
 .
 .
 .
 .
 .
 .
 .
 .
 . (Spanish edition originally published by Abingdon Press, 2013.)
 .
 .
 .
 .
 .
 .
 .
 .

References

1937 births
20th-century American theologians
20th-century Methodist ministers
20th-century Protestant theologians
21st-century American theologians
21st-century Methodist ministers
21st-century Protestant theologians
American Christian theologians
American historians of religion
American people of Cuban descent
American United Methodist clergy
Candler School of Theology
Cuban United Methodist clergy
Emory University faculty
Historians of Christianity
Liberation theologians
Living people
Methodist theologians
Yale University alumni
World Christianity scholars